Tân Phú Đông is a new rural district (huyện) of Tiền Giang province in the Mekong Delta region of Vietnam. This district located in an islet named "Lợi Quan" of the Mekong River. It was established in 2008 and is a poorest district in Tiền Giang Province. Its territory came from split of Gò Công Đông district and Gò Công Tây district.

Tân Phú Đông is subdivided into 6 communes:
Phú Đông
Phú Tân
Phú Thạnh
Tân Thới
Tân Phú
Tân Thạnh

References

Districts of Tiền Giang province